This is a list of folk music traditions, with styles, dances, instruments and other related topics. The term folk music can not be easily defined in a precise manner; it is used with widely varying definitions depending on the author, intended audience and context within a work. Similarly, the term traditions in this context does not connote any strictly-defined criteria. Music scholars, journalists, audiences, record industry individuals, politicians, nationalists and demagogues may often have occasion to address which fields of folk music are to a distinct group of people and with characteristics undiluted by contact with the music of other peoples; thus, the folk music traditions described herein overlap in varying degrees with each other. Sometimes, folk songs will often be passed down.

Europe 

{{Folk country row
|Tradition        = English <ref>

Notes

References 
 
 
 
 
 
 
 
 
 
 
 
 
 

F
Traditional music
Western culture